Heart 70s is a national digital radio station owned and operated by Global as a spin-off from Heart. The station broadcasts from studios at Leicester Square in London.

Launched on 30 August 2019, Heart 70s is a rolling music service playing non-stop “feel good” music from the 1970s. It has its own dedicated live breakfast show, hosted by Carlos, 6–10am on weekdays. At other times, the station is mostly an automated service. On 8 January 2021, Heart 70s announced that Carlos would host a Saturday Show from 8am–12noon with the first programme being on 9 January 2021.

References

External links 

1970s
Global Radio
Radio stations established in 2019
1970s-themed radio stations